Brigid Kemmerer (born January 11, 1978) is an American author of young adult fiction. She worked in the finance industry before becoming a full-time writer. Her novel A Curse So Dark and Lonely, an adaptation of Beauty and the Beast, was a New York Times bestseller and received a starred review from Publishers Weekly. Her standalone novel More Than We Can Tell received a starred review from the School Library Journal.

Works

Elemental series 
 Elemental (#0.5) (2012)
 Storm (#1) (2012)
 Fearless (#1.5) (2012)
 Spark (#2) (2012)
 Breathless (#2.5) (2013)
 Spirit (#3) (2013)
 Secret (#4) (2014)
 Sacrifice (#5) (2014)

Letters to the Lost series 

 Letters to the Lost (2017)
 More Than We Can Tell (2018)

Cursebreakers series 
 A Curse So Dark and Lonely (2019)
 A Heart So Fierce and Broken (2020)
 A Vow So Bold and Deadly (2021)

Defy the Night series 
 Defy the Night (2021)
 Defend the Dawn (2022)

Standalone novels 
 Thicker Than Water (2015)
 Call It What You Want (2019)

References

External links 

 
 Q&A with Publishers Weekly
 Interview with The Children's Book Review

1978 births
Living people
Writers from Omaha, Nebraska